Julio Gutiérrez may refer to:
Julio Gutiérrez (musician) (1918–1990), Cuban pianist
Julio Gutiérrez (footballer) (born 1979), Chilean footballer
Julio Andrés Gutiérrez (born 1983), Uruguayan footballer
Julio Gutiérrez García, Spanish track and field athlete
Julio César Gutiérrez Vega, Mexican physicist